Jeffrey Parmer (born April 27, 1985) is an American professional basketball player for Tryhoop Okayama in Japan.

Career statistics 

|-
| align="left" |  2010-11
| align="left" | Hamamatsu
| 46 || 45 || 26.7 || .510 || .320 || .774 || 9.0 || 2.5 || 1.6 || .4 ||  16.9
|-
| align="left" |  2011-12
| align="left" | Hamamatsu
| 52 || 47 || 24.6 || .434 || .331 || .770 || 6.5 || 1.7 || 1.0 || .4 || 12.6
|-
| align="left" |  2012-13
| align="left" | Hamamatsu
| 50 || 42 || 29.1 || .391 || .291 || .782 || 6.3 || 2.9 || 1.2 || .3 ||  13.6
|-
| align="left" |  2013-14
| align="left" | Shinshu
| 48 ||  || 28.9 || .445 || .254 || .777 || 7.6 || 2.5 || 1.7 || .5 ||  11.8
|-
| align="left" |  2014-15
| align="left" | Shiga
|  ||  ||  ||  ||  ||  ||  ||  ||  ||  || 
|-
| align="left" |  2015-16
| align="left" | Shiga
| 51||  || 27.6|| .552|| .315|| .702|| 7.5|| 2.3|| 1.4|| 0.6||  12.9
|-
| align="left" | 2016-17
| align="left" | Yokohama
| 60||53|| 30:25|| .440|| .322|| .723|| 7.8|| 1.6|| 1.1|| 0.78||  15.0

References

External links
Florida Atlantic Owls bio

1985 births
Living people
American expatriate basketball people in Japan
American expatriate basketball people in Spain
American expatriate basketball people in Uruguay
American men's basketball players
Bambitious Nara players
Basket Navarra Club players
Basketball players from New York (state)
CB L'Hospitalet players
Club Biguá de Villa Biarritz basketball players
Florida Atlantic Owls men's basketball players
Junior college men's basketball players in the United States
Power forwards (basketball)
Providence Friars men's basketball players
Rizing Zephyr Fukuoka players
San-en NeoPhoenix players
Shiga Lakes players
Shinshu Brave Warriors players
Sportspeople from Niagara Falls, New York
Tryhoop Okayama players
Yokohama B-Corsairs players